Jenifer Burrage Branning (born March 13, 1979) is an American lawyer and politician. She serves as a Republican member of the Mississippi State Senate.

Early life
Jenifer Branning was born on March 13, 1979. Her family has lived in Neshoba County, Mississippi for five generations. Her grandfather was Olen Lovell Burrage who was involved in the 1964 Freedom Summer Murders.

Branning graduated from Mississippi State University, where she received a bachelor of arts degree. She received a juris doctor from the Mississippi College School of Law in 2004.

Career
Branning is a lawyer in Philadelphia, Mississippi. In 2015, she ran to win state senator Giles Ward's seat. She has served as a Republican member of the Mississippi State Senate since January 2016, where she represents District 18, including parts of Leake County, Neshoba County, and Winston County.

Personal life
Branning has a husband, Chancy. She is a Christian.

References

Living people
1979 births
People from Philadelphia, Mississippi
Mississippi State University alumni
Mississippi College School of Law alumni
Mississippi lawyers
Republican Party Mississippi state senators
Women state legislators in Mississippi
21st-century American politicians
21st-century American women politicians